is a 2004 Japanese film directed by Hideyuki Hirayama, based on a story by Kaoru Takamura.

Cast
 Tetsuya Watari as Seizo Monoi
 Satoshi Tokushige as Yuichiro Gouda
 Koji Kikkawa as Shuhei Handa
 Jun Kunimura as Satoru Hirose
 Ren Osugi as Junichi Nunokawa
 Mitsuru Fukikoshi as Katsumi Ko
 Haruhiko Kato as Yokichi Matsudo
 Miho Kanno as Yoshiko Shiroyama
 Ittoku Kishibe as Seiichi Shirai
 Kyozo Nagatsuka as Kyohei Shiroyama

References

External links
 

2004 films
2000s crime films
Films based on Japanese novels
Films directed by Hideyuki Hirayama
Japanese crime films
2000s Japanese films
2000s Japanese-language films